The Intercity Nieuwe Generatie (Intercity New Generation), or ICNG is an electric multiple unit trainset planned to be operated by Nederlandse Spoorwegen. In addition to supplementing the existing intercity rolling stock, it will replace the Bombardier TRAXX locomotives and Intercity Rijtuig coaches on the high-speed line between Amsterdam and Belgium. This will provide the connection that was originally planned to be provided by the Fyra service, which was cancelled in 2013. 

The process to acquire the trains began in 2014, eventually resulting in trains built by Alstom based on their Coradia Stream platform. The trains arrived in the Netherlands starting in 2020, and after a period of testing, are expected to go into domestic service from the summer of 2023.

History
The NS began procurement of a new intercity trainset in July 2014. At that time, it aimed to receive the trains in 2021 and to start deployment in 2022. The respondents were Alstom, Siemens, Bombardier and Stadler. In May 2016 NS announced that Alstom had won a contract for around 80 trainsets. At the end of May, the contract was finalized to include a total of 79 trainsets, including 49 5-car units and 30 8-car units.

Since the cancellation of the Fyra service, NS had been operating the Intercity Direct service using Traxx locomotives and existing intercity coaches. To replace these, the order with Alstom was expanded with trains capable of running on both Belgian and Dutch track. In 2017, the order was expanded with two 8-car trains, which was later expanded to a total of 20 trains.

The first train arrived in the Netherlands on 23 May 2020 to begin testing on the Dutch railway network. Permission to operate on the Dutch network was granted at the end of 2022. 

, NS plans to start introducing the trains into service in the summer of 2023. The ICNG will eventually operate at speeds up to 200 km/h on the high-speed line between Schiphol and Breda, a significant improvement over the existing equipment, which can only operate up to 160 km/h.

Incidents
 On 16 October 2020, two ICNG units were being towed when the train derailed at Dreileben, Germany. The driver of the locomotive hauling the train was injured. The two units were being towed by a diesel locomotive from the Alstom factory at Salzgitter routed via Magdeburg for 25 kV AC railway electrification testing at Blankenburg (Harz) station on the Rübeland Railway. During 18 October 2020 rail cranes were used to place the derailed unit 3105 back on the rails, with 3109 having survived without derailment. The diesel locomotive 214 006 remained in the field.

Description
The train type is divided into three classes: 3100, 3200 and 3300. The classes differ by their length and electric systems.

Interior 
The trains are equipped with a universal (wheelchair accessible) toilet, followed by a special wheelchair space for two wheelchairs. The five-car train set is also equipped with one universal toilet, the eight-car train set with two standard toilets. The trains are also equipped with first and second class sections, which are divided into sections for "work", "silence" and "meet & greet". Extra luggage racks have been installed on the Belgian 33xx version for their international journeys. There are sockets and USB connections for charging a telephone or laptop in both the first and second class the usual NS onboard information screens and free WiFi are available on the trains.

3300 Series for Belgium 
The version for Belgium trainsets come with eight carriages, each good for 410 seats. This version has an extra toilet and more luggage space, and is suitable for the Belgian rail protection system and 3kV overhead lines

NS placed an additional order early on for two Coradia suitable for the Belgian rail network (ICNGB),  because the train stock in use for the Amsterdam – Brussels connection in 2025 is due for replacement. With that order, the intention was to test these two trainsets and to obtain approval for the Belgian rail network, after which a follow-up order could be placed. This covered the risk that the admission would expire. However, the first follow-up order for eighteen trains has already been placed sooner, well before the first trains have entered service, so that from 2025, 20 units will be available for service to Belgium.

References

High-speed trains of the Netherlands
Electric multiple units of the Netherlands
Alstom Coradia
25 kV AC multiple units
3000 V DC multiple units
1500 V DC multiple units of the Netherlands